Benicàssim railway station is the central railway station of Benicàssim, Spain. The station is part of Adif and is served by RENFE Alvia long-distance and medium-distance trains.

Services

References

Railway stations in the Valencian Community
Railway stations in Spain opened in 1863